Next Time Ned is a 2008 Scottish feature film, written and directed by Thomas McCue and starring Raymond Mearns as Ned Randall.

It featured Glasgow band San Sebastian on its soundtrack. The theme tune of "I Belong To Glasgow" was recorded by Glasgow band Funkilicious.

The film was premiered on 8 May 2009 at Jumping Jak's in Glasgow. A director's cut of the film was released on Amazon Prime Video in September 2020.

Cast
 Raymond Mearns as Ned Randall
 Iain Robertson as Driving Casting Agent 
 Scott Campbell as Interviewer
 Adrianne Boyd as Audrey Randall
 Lynn Mulvenna as Amy
 Sean Boyle as Danny
 Laura Pearson-Smith as Sharon (as Laura Pearson)
 Vivien Taylor as Leah
 Kevin McIntyre as Martin 
 Ian Barrie as Hector
 Hayley Horbatowska as Hardmen Casting Director
 Michael McGill as Nigel

References

2008 films
Scottish drama films
Scottish comedy films
2000s English-language films
2000s British films